The following is a list of squads for each nation who competed at the 2013 FIFA Confederations Cup in Brazil from 15 to 30 June 2013, as a prelude to the 2014 FIFA World Cup. Each squad consisted of 23 players, three of which had to be goalkeepers. Replacement of injured players was permitted until 24 hours before the team's game. Players marked (c) were named as captain for their national team.

Group A

Brazil 
Head coach: Luiz Felipe Scolari

Scolari named his 23-man squad on 14 May 2013.

On 7 June, Leandro Damião withdrew from the squad with a thigh injury and was replaced by Jô.

Japan 
Head coach:  Alberto Zaccheroni

Zaccheroni announced his 23-man squad on 5 June 2013.

Mexico 
Head coach: José Manuel de la Torre

De la Torre named his 23-man squad on 20 May 2013.

Italy 
Head coach: Cesare Prandelli

Prandelli named his 23-man squad on 3 June 2013.

Group B

Spain 
Head coach: Vicente del Bosque

Del Bosque named his 23-man squad on 2 June 2013.

Uruguay 
Head coach: Óscar Tabárez

Tabárez named his 23-man squad on 4 June 2013.

Tahiti 
Head coach: Eddy Etaeta

Etaeta named his 23-man squad on 24 May 2013.

Nigeria 
Head coach: Stephen Keshi

Keshi named his 23-man squad on 7 June 2013.

Player representation

By club nationality 

Nations in italics are not represented by their national teams in the finals.

By representatives of domestic league

Notes

References

External links 
FIFA Confederations Cup Brazil 2013 at FIFA.com

FIFA Confederations Cup squads
Squads